James Laidlaw is a British anthropologist.

Laidlaw was born on 12 September 1963. He attended the University of Cambridge as an undergraduate, and remained there for his graduate study, culminating in a Ph.D. in 1990. While pursuing a doctoral degree, Laidlaw was appointed a junior research fellow at Cambridge in 1989. He was promoted to senior research fellow in 1993, eventually advancing to fellow of King's College. In 2016, he became William Wyse Professor of Social Anthropology and until October 2021, he was the head of the Cambridge Department of Social Anthropology. His areas of ethnographic research include Asian religions, especially Jainism in India, about which he published a monograph in 1995, and Buddhism in Taiwan. He has also been among the early proponents of the influential turn to studying ethics in sociocultural anthropology, through his 2001 Malinowski Memorial Lecutre, and his 2013 "path-breaking book-length construction of the field", which Webb Keane has described as "a major work that I expect will be a cornerstone of our teaching for a generation." Finally, together with Caroline Humphrey, Laidlaw has developed an influential theory of ritual.

References

1963 births
Living people
Academics of the University of Cambridge
Alumni of the University of Cambridge
British anthropologists
Fellows of King's College, Cambridge
20th-century anthropologists
21st-century anthropologists
William Wyse Professors of Social Anthropology